Katharinenrieth is a village and a former municipality in the Mansfeld-Südharz district, Saxony-Anhalt, Germany. Since 1 January 2010, it is part of the town Allstedt, of which it forms an Ortschaft.

References 

Former municipalities in Saxony-Anhalt
Allstedt